This article is about the particular significance of the decade 1890–1899 to Wales and its people.

Incumbents
Prince of Wales – Albert Edward
Princess of Wales – Alexandra
Archdruid of the National Eisteddfod of Wales
Clwydfardd (to 1894)
Hwfa Môn (from 1895)

Events
Events of 1890
Events of 1891
Events of 1892
Events of 1893
Events of 1894
Events of 1895
Events of 1896
Events of 1897
Events of 1898
Events of 1899

Arts and literature

Awards
National Eisteddfod of Wales 
1890 – Bangor
Chair – Thomas Tudno Jones
Crown – John John Roberts
1891 – Swansea
Chair – John Owen Williams
Crown – David Adams
1892 – Rhyl
Chair – Evan Jones
Crown – John John Roberts
1893 – Pontypridd
Chair – John Ceulanydd Williams
Crown – Ben Davies
1894 – Caernarfon
Chair – Howell Elvet Lewis
Crown – Ben Davies
1895 – Llanelli
Chair – John Owen Williams
Crown – Lewis William Lewis
1896 – Llandudno
Chair – Ben Davies
Crown – withheld
1897 – Newport
Chair – John Thomas Job
Crown – Thomas Mafonwy Davies
1898 – Blaenau Ffestiniog
Chair – Robert Owen Hughes
Crown – Richard Roberts
1899 – Cardiff
Chair – withheld
Crown – Richard Roberts

New books
Anne Beale – Old Gwen (1890)
Rhoda Broughton
Alas! (1890)
Mrs Bligh (1892)
Foes in Law (1899)
Caniadau Cymru (anthology) (1897)
Amy Dillwyn – Maggie Steele's Diary (1892)
Owen Morgan Edwards – Cymru (1892)
Beriah Gwynfe Evans – Dafydd Dafis (1898)
John Gruffydd Moelwyn Hughes – Caniadau Moelwyn (1893)
Arthur Machen – The Three Impostors (1895)
Daniel Owen – Enoc Huws (1891)

Film
1896 – The first news film ever shot in Britain shows the Prince and Princess of Wales visiting an exhibition in Cardiff.  This was also the first ever motion picture of the prince.

Music
Sir Henry Walford Davies – Symphony in D (1894)
Joseph Parry – Saul of Tarsus (oratorio) (1892)

Sport
Horse racing – The Welsh Grand National is run for the first time, at Ely, Cardiff.

Births
1890
21 June – W. J. A. Davies, rugby player (died 1967)
16 December – P. J. Grigg, politician (died 1964)
1891
13 February – Kate Roberts, author (died 1985)
1893
15 January – Ivor Novello, composer and actor (died 1951)
date unknown – Lewis Valentine, political activist
1894
23 June – Prince Edward (later Prince of Wales, Edward VIII and finally Duke of Windsor; died 1972)
date unknown – Ambrose Bebb, author and politician (died 1955)
1895
22 January – Iorwerth Thomas, politician (died 1966)
1 March – William Richard Williams, civil servant (died 1963)
date unknown – Albert Evans-Jones ("Cynan"), poet and Archdruid (died 1970)
1896
1 May – Hubert William Lewis, VC recipient (died 1977)
1897
15 November – Aneurin Bevan, politician (died 1960)
1898
10 February – Thomas Jones, Baron Maelor, politician (died 1984)
29 July – Dorothy Rees, politician (died 1987)
24 September – Henry Arthur Evans, politician (died 1958)
date unknown – William John Edwards, cerdd dant singer (died 1978)
1899
17 May – H. H. Price, philosopher (died 1984)
20 December – Martyn Lloyd-Jones, preacher (died 1981)
date unknown – Len Davies, footballer (died 1945)

Deaths
1890
17 January – Christopher Rice Mansel Talbot, landowner (born 1803)
20 January – Guillermo Rawson, Argentinian politician and patron of Patagonian Welsh colony (born 1821)
19 March – Edmund Swetenham, MP for Caernarfon
29 June – Henry Herbert, 4th Earl of Carnarvon (born 1831)
20 July – David Davies "Llandinam", industrialist (born 1818)
1891
26 September – David Charles Davies, Nonconformist leader (born 1826)
date unknown
Sir Love Jones-Parry, politician (born 1832)
Hugh Owen Thomas, pioneering orthopaedic surgeon (born 1834)
1893
23 January – Dr William Price, eccentric (born 1800)
1894
24 February – John Roberts, politician (born 1835)
1895
15 January – Lady Charlotte Guest, translator of the Mabinogion (born 1812)
22 October – Daniel Owen, novelist (born 1836)
1896
17 January – Augusta Hall, Baroness Llanover, patron of the arts (born 1802)
30 December – Evan Herber Evans, Nonconformist leader (born 1836)
1897
15 October – Charles John Vaughan, former Dean of Llandaff (born 1816)
1898
17 June – Sir Edward Burne-Jones, artist (born 1833)
28 September – Thomas Gee, publisher (born 1815)
2 December – Michael D. Jones, Patagonian settler (born 1822)
1899
5 April – T. E. Ellis, politician (born 1859)
August – Owen Glynne Jones, mountaineer (born 1867)